Barthélemy Théodore, Count de Theux de Meylandt (26 February 1794 – 21 August 1874) was a Belgian Roman Catholic politician who served as the prime minister of Belgium three times. His family de Theux de Meylandt et Montjardin originated in Theux in 1341.

Life

Barthélemy Théodore de Theux de Meylandt was born in the castle of Schabroek in Sint-Truiden on 26 February 1794. 
He was Minister of State (Belgium), a member of the National Congress, Belgium's Prime Minister (1834–1840, 1846–1847 and 1871–1874), Minister of Internal Affairs (1831–1832, 1834–1840 & 1846–1847) & Minister of Foreign Affairs (1836–1840).

The count died in Heusden, in the Meylandt Castle on 21 August 1874 in Belgium.
He was the first Belgian Prime Minister to die in office.

First government
The first government of Barthélémy de Theux de Meylandt was in office from 4 August 1834 to 18 April 1840. Members were:

Second government

The second government of Barthélémy de Theux de Meylandt was in office from 31 March 1846 to 12 August 1847. Members were:

Third government
The third government of Barthélémy de Theux de Meylandt was in office from 7 December 1871 to 11 June 1878. When Barthélémy de Theux de Meylandt died on 21 August 1874 he was succeeded by Jules Malou, Minister of Finance.
Members were:

Honours 

National honours
  : 
 Minister of State, by Royal Decree.
 Grand Cordon of the Order of Leopold.
 Croix de Fer.

Foreign Honours
  : Officer in the Legion of Honour.
  : Knight Grand Cross in the Order of Saints Maurice and Lazarus.
  : Knight Grand Cross in the Order of Charles III.
  : Knight Grand Cross in the Pontifical Order of Saint Gregory the Great.
  : Knight Grand Cross in the Military Order of Christ.
 : Grand Cross with Brilliants in the (de jure Ottoman Tunisian) Order of Nicham-el-Oftikhar.

Political offices

|-

|-

References

External links
 Barthélémy de Theux de Meylandt in ODIS - Online Database for Intermediary Structures

1794 births
1874 deaths
Belgian Ministers of State
Knights Grand Cross of the Order of Saints Maurice and Lazarus
Knights Grand Cross of the Order of St Gregory the Great
Grand Crosses of the Order of Christ (Portugal)
Catholic Party (Belgium) politicians
Counts of Belgium
Members of the National Congress of Belgium
People from Sint-Truiden
Belgian Roman Catholics
Prime Ministers of Belgium